The 2017 Ironman 70.3 World Championship was a long distance triathlon competition held on September 9–10, 2017 in Chattanooga, Tennessee that was won by Javier Gomez of Spain and Daniela Ryf of Switzerland. The championship was organized by the World Triathlon Corporation (WTC) and it marked the first time the race was held on two separate days, splitting the days of competition between male and female competitors. For Ryf it was her third Ironman 70.3 World Championship win. This was Gomez's second 70.3 championship win having won also in 2014.

Championship results

Men

Women

References

External links
Ironman website

Ironman World Championship
Sports competitions in Tennessee
Ironman 70.3
Ironman 70.3
Triathlon competitions in the United States